Guy Rouleau may refer to:

 Guy Rouleau (politician)  (1923–2010), Liberal party member of the Canadian House of Commons
 Guy Rouleau (ice hockey) (1965–2008), Canadian ice hockey player